alsamixer is a graphical mixer program for the Advanced Linux Sound Architecture (ALSA) that is used to configure sound settings and adjust the volume. It has an ncurses user interface and does not require the X Window System. It supports multiple sound cards with multiple devices.

See also 
 Aplay
 Softvol

References

External links
 Alsamixer - ALSA wiki

Advanced Linux Sound Architecture
Linux audio video-related software
Software that uses ncurses